Pratum Chuthong (born October 26, 1983) is a Thai retired professional footballer who played as a defender.

Club career

Pratum played for Osotspa Saraburi FC for a long time, and was a regular starter for the team. He later moved to Buriram United in 2012. His form in Buriram is consistent and played regularly. Pratum played in the 2012 AFC Champions League and the 2013 AFC Champions League for Buriram United. At the start of the 2013 Thai Premier League he played a few matches, but later on his form was not the best. Therefore, Tanasak Srisai won Pratum's place as centre back. His form came back in July and he became starter.

International career
Pratum Chuthong was called up to the national team, in coach Winfried Schäfer first squad selection for the  2014 FIFA World Cup qualification. 
In October, 2013 Pratum was called up to the national team by Surachai Jaturapattarapong to the 2015 AFC Asian Cup qualification.
In October, 2013 he played a friendly match against Bahrain.
In October 15, 2013 he played against Iran in the 2015 AFC Asian Cup qualification.
In May 2015, he was called up to Thailand to play in the 2018 FIFA World Cup qualification (AFC) against Vietnam.

Style of Play
Although Pratum is not a tall defender, he is stocky and muscular. Pratum could play both right back or left back. He is known for being a tough tackling and being an aggressive defender.

International

Honours

Club
Buriram United
 Thai League 1 (2): 2013, 2014
 Thai FA Cup (2): 2012, 2013
 Thai League Cup (2): 2012, 2013
 Kor Royal Cup (2): 2013, 2014
Chiangrai United
 Thai FA Cup (1): 2017

International

Thailand
 ASEAN Football Championship (1): 2016

References

External links

1983 births
Living people
Pratum Chuthong
Pratum Chuthong
Association football central defenders
Pratum Chuthong
Pratum Chuthong
Pratum Chuthong
Pratum Chuthong
Pratum Chuthong
Pratum Chuthong